The 1908–09 season was Blackpool F.C.'s 12th season (ninth consecutive) in the Football League. They competed in the twenty-team Division Two, then the second tier of English football, finishing bottom. The club's application for re-election was successful.

Bob Whittingham top-scored for the second consecutive season. He achieved the feat despite his leaving the club for Bradford City in January.

Season synopsis
Blackpool were undefeated in their first five league games, a sequence that included two victories. Their first turnover, a 0–4 scoreline, occurred at Barnsley on 3 October. They failed to win away from Bloomfield Road in the League; a record that would not be equalled for 106 years.

Only seven more victories ensued in their 31 remaining league games, which largely accounted for their lowly finishing position. Of the eleven league games in which Bob Whittingham scored, Blackpool won four, drew five and lost two. After his departure, they only won three of their remaining sixteen games.

The club's FA Cup run ended at the second-round stage, with a 2–1 defeat at Newcastle United on 6 February. They defeated Hastings & St Leonards United 2–0 in the first round.

Table

Player statistics

Appearances

League
 Fiske – 37
 Crewdson – 36
 Connor – 35
 Beare – 33
 Baddeley – 32
 Threlfall – 28
 Parkinson – 26
 Whittingham, S. – 23
 Whittingham, B. – 22
 Grundy – 21
 Scott – 20
 Weston – 20
 Reid – 16
 Clarke – 11
 Dawson – 9
 Lyon – 8
 Swan – 7
 Walker – 7
 Whiteside – 6
 Whalley – 5
 Miller – 4
 Tonge – 4
 Bradshaw – 2
 Gladwin – 2
 Latheron – 1
 Stephenson – 1
 Sterling – 1
 Tillotson – 1

Players used: 28

FA Cup
 Baddeley – 2
 Beare – 2
 Connor – 2
 Crewdson – 2
 Fiske – 2
 Parkinson – 2
 Scott – 2
 Gillibrand – 1
 Lyon – 1
 Reid – 1
 Swan – 1
 Threlfall – 1
 Weston – 1
 Whalley – 1
 Whittingham, S. – 1

Players used: 15

Goals

League
 Whittingham, B. – 13
 Beare – 8
 Grundy – 8
 Weston – 4
 Baddeley – 3
 Walker – 3
 Lyon – 2
 Reid – 2
 Whalley – 2
 Swan – 1

League goals scored: 46

FA Cup
 Threlfall – 1
 Whalley – 1
 Weston – 1

FA Cup goals scored: 3

Transfers

In

Out
The following players left after the final game of the previous season:

Notes

References
 

Blackpool F.C.
Blackpool F.C. seasons